No Sin on the Alpine Pastures (German: Auf der Alm, da gibt's ka Sünd) is a 1915 German silent comedy film directed by Rudolf Biebrach and starring Henny Porten, Emmy Wyda, and Lupu Pick. Location shooting took place in the Bavarian town of Bad Reichenhall.

Cast
 Henny Porten as Käte 
 Rudolf Biebrach as Kammergerichtsrat Hannemann 
 Emmy Wyda as Malchen Hannemann 
 Lupu Pick as Seppl 
 Max Wilmsen as Dr. Walter Kreuznach 
 Karl Harbacher
 Arnold Rieck

References

Bibliography
 Bock, Hans-Michael & Bergfelder, Tim. The Concise CineGraph. Encyclopedia of German Cinema. Berghahn Books, 2009.

External links

1915 films
1915 comedy films
German comedy films
Films of the German Empire
German silent feature films
Films directed by Rudolf Biebrach
Films set in Bavaria
Films shot in Bavaria
Films set in the Alps
Silent comedy films
1910s German films
1910s German-language films